Tehillim for Anne is a three-movement musical composition by British composer Robert Steadman (born 1965).

Scored for choir and strings the work uses the texts of three Psalms in Hebrew to mark what would have been the 75th birthday of Anne Frank. The piece was premiered by Southwell Choral Society in November 2004 in Southwell Minster, Nottinghamshire conducted by Nicholas Thorpe. 

The central movement includes the choir shouting and screaming the psalm texts like a baying mob.

Tehillim for Anne lasts 20 minutes.

External links
 Robert Steadman's website

Choral compositions
Cultural depictions of Anne Frank